Sergey Stanislavovich Rakhmanin (born October 18, 1961 in Karl-Marx-Stadt, Germany) is a Russian powered and glider aerobatic pilot and flight instructor.

Powered aerobatic competitions

In 1991, he became the last USSR Absolute Aerobatic Champion. Sergei Rakhmanin won the title in the overall category of FAI European Aerobatic Championships in 1999 and FAI World Aerobatic Championships in 2003 and in 2005.

Glider aerobatic competitions

He won the bronze medal in the 1995 World Glider Aerobatic Championships and the team gold together with Mikhail Mamistov and Victor Tchmal. Additionally, he won the team gold medal in the 1996 European Glider Aerobatic Championships together with Mikhail Mamistov and Sergei Krikalev.

Red Bull Air Races

He raced in 2007 and 2008 Red Bull Air Race World Championships.

Legend: 
 CAN: Cancelled
 DNP: Did not participate
 DNS: Did not show
 DQ: Disqualified
 NC: Not classified

Awards and honours

He is awarded "Honored Master of Sport of Russia", and received in 2006 the FAI Air Sport Medal.

Family

He lives in St. Petersburg, Russia and is married with one child.

See also
 Competition aerobatics
 FAI World Aerobatic Championships
 FAI European Aerobatic Championships

References

Sergey Rakhmanin Racing Team official website
Red Bull Air Race World Series official website

1961 births
Living people
People from Chemnitz
Russian aviators
Russian air racers
Red Bull Air Race World Championship pilots
Aerobatic pilots
Glider pilots